Junior World Gymnastics Championships refers to a number of different World Championships in four disciplines recognized by the International Gymnastics Federation (FIG) in competitive gymnastics: acrobatic gymnastics, men's and women's artistic gymnastics, and rhythmic gymnastics.

History
Before merging with FIG in 1999, the International Federation of Sports Acrobatics (IFSA) organized and promoted World Junior Championships in acrobatic gymnastics from 1989 to 1999. As of 2019, FIG has organized junior world championships in artistic and rhythmic gymnastics.

Currently, FIG organizes periodical World Age Group competitions in aerobic gymnastics, acrobatic gymnastics and trampoline. The former governing body for trampoline, the International Trampoline Federation (FIT), incorporated into the FIG in 1998, also organized World Age Groups competitions from 1973 to 1996. These competitions, however, are not considered world championships.

Acrobatic 
Format:

1989–1999: Junior World Championships
2001–2002: World Age Group Games
2004–2006: International Age Group Competition
2008–: World Age Group Competition

Artistic

Rhythmic

Trampoline 

FIG Trampoline Gymnastics World Age Group Competitions are currently held in 32 disciplines:
 Categories and age:
 Trampoline (Age Group 1 / Age Group 2 / Age Group 3 / Age Group 4)
 Synchronised Trampoline (Age Group 1 / Age Group 2 / Age Group 3 / Age Group 4)
 Tumbling (Age Group 1 / Age Group 2 / Age Group 3 / Age Group 4)
 Double-Mini (Age Group 1 / Age Group 2 / Age Group 3 / Age Group 4) 
 11-12 / 13-14 / 15-16 / 17-21 

Since 1998, the championships are held alongside the Trampoline Gymnastics World Championships, often a week later and in the same venue. From 1990 to 1996, the junior championships were in the same country as the Trampoline Gymnastics World Championships, but in a different city. The earlier championships, from 1973 to 1988, had separate hosts, unrelated to the Trampoline Gymnastics World Championships.

Aerobic 
FIG Aerobic Gymnastics World Age Group Competitions :

See also
 Gymnastics World Championships
 Gymnastics at the Youth Olympics
 Major achievements in gymnastics by nation

References

 
World youth sports competitions
Recurring sporting events established in 1989